Agartala Vidhan Sabha constituency is one of the 60 assembly constituencies of Tripura, a northeastern state of India. It is a part of Tripura West Lok Sabha constituency.

Members of Legislative Assembly

^ by-poll

Election results

2023 election

2022 by-election

2018 election

2013 election

See also

 Agartala
 List of constituencies of Tripura Legislative Assembly
 West Tripura district

References

West Tripura district
Agartala
Tripura Legislative Assembly
Assembly constituencies of Tripura